Hope High School is a public high school in the East Side of Providence, Rhode Island, U.S. operated by Providence Public School District. It was founded in 1898.  Its current building was completed in June 1936. St Charles Vocational Program it’s Former Program for Special Education.

Community system
In 2003, Hope High School was partitioned into three semi-independent "communities": Hope High School Arts Community, Hope High School Technology Community, and Hope Leadership Community—each with its own principal. Since June 2009, the Leadership Community no longer exists and as of June 2012, the Arts and Technology communities were merged into one school.

The triune system was developed in an attempt to remedy a history of exceptionally low test scores (2008 SAT combined score was 1047, over 900 points lower than Moses Brown School, a private school 2 blocks away) at Hope High School.  Many regard Hope High - and the future success or failure of these reforms - as a "litmus test" for educational reform in Rhode Island.

It serves grades 9-12 with a total of 949 students as of the 2020 academic year.

Student demographics

Athletic history
Hope High School won four baseball championships and three football championships between 1918 and 1929. Hope won the 1917, 1928, 1930, 1990, and 1992 state interscholastic outdoor track meet championships.  The cross country team was the division two state champions 1988-1992.  Hope's soccer team won the Rhode Island division 1 championship in 2006.

In 1938 Hope High's basketball team not only won the RI Schoolboy State Championship,  the boys from Hope Street went on to win the New England Basketball Championship hosted in Connecticut.  Charles Melay Simon earned all New England Honors to go along with his RI Schoolboy All State Honors.

In the period 1960 through 1963, Hope High's Falkmen (coach Bill Falk) were undefeated in cross-country, indoor and outdoor track competition winning both Division1 and State Championships all 4 years. In the winter of 1961, Hope High teams were Division 1 and State Champions in Basketball, Hockey, and Indoor Track - the three major winter sports at the time.

The 1956, 1960, and 1961 Hope hockey teams, coached by Ed Mullen, were crowned R.I. State champions.

Notable people

Alumni
 Richard S. Aldrich, U.S. Representative
 Deon Anderson, former NFL player. Spent only one season in the school
 Edward Beard, U.S. Representative
 Ray Jarvis, MLB player (Boston Red Sox)
 H. P. Lovecraft, horror author
 Ben Powers, actor Good Times and Mike Hammer
 Al Russas, former NFL player

Faculty
Frank Caprio, former teacher

References

External links
 	
 Official website

High schools in Providence, Rhode Island
Public high schools in Rhode Island
1898 establishments in Rhode Island